Byōbunozoki (folding screen peeper) is a Japanese monster in the collection of monster paintings by Toriyama Sekien, "Konjaku Hyakki Shūi".

Overview
According to the commentary in The One Hundred Demons, the Byōbunozoki is a monster who looks at a person from the outside of a folding screen, and looks beyond the 7-inch folding screen. According to Chinese classics, the Qin Shio emperor jumped over the screen of Xianyang Palace when he was about to be murdered.

View more
 List of legendary creatures from Japan

References

Edo-period works